Hypobrycon is a genus of characin found in the Uruguay River basin in South America.

Species
There are currently 2 recognized species in this genus:
 Hypobrycon maromba M. C. Malabarba & L. R. Malabarba, 1994
 Hypobrycon poi Almirón, Casciotta, Azpelicueta & Cione, 2001

References

Characidae
Fish of South America